The Niagara Gorge Discovery Center, also known as the Schoellkopf Geological Museum, is on the American side of Niagara Falls within Niagara Falls State Park and the city of Niagara Falls, New York.  It opened in 1971. Its role is to showcase the natural history of the Falls and the Niagara Gorge via the ancient rock layers and minerals. The museum also showcases the history of the Great Gorge Route trolley line and features a number of hiking trails.

The museum's location is where the Schoellkopf Power Station, one of the first hydroelectric plants in the United States, stood until it was destroyed by rockfall in 1956.

References

External links
Niagara Gorge Discover Center Official Site

Museums in Niagara County, New York
Natural history museums in New York (state)
Buildings and structures in Niagara Falls, New York
Geology museums in New York (state)
Schoellkopf family
1971 establishments in New York (state)
Museums established in 1971